Pancake art is an art form in which works are created on a griddle or frying pan using pancake batter as the medium applied from a pancake pen. Batters containing different food coloring may be used to create a color piece, or contrasting shades can be achieved by allowing parts of the image to cook longer. When cooking is complete, the pancake is flipped over to reveal the final image.

References

External links
 

Pancakes
Folk art